Julio César Ribas Vlacovich (born January 8, 1957) is a Uruguayan association football manager and former footballer. He currently manages the Gibraltar national team.

Career as manager
Ribas was appointed the manager of Primera Division Uruguaya side Peñarol in January 2009.

Following the Oman national football team's defeat against Japan in the 2010 FIFA World Cup qualifiers, the Omani Football Association sacked Ribas, due to the result and the performance of the team in that match.

He is the current manager of Gibraltar.

Personal life
He is the father of footballer Sebastián Ribas who plays for Central Córdoba (SdE).

Honours

Managerial statistics

References

External links

Statistics on GELP.org

1957 births
Living people
Uruguayan people of Croatian descent
People from Rivera Department
Uruguayan footballers
Association football midfielders
C.A. Bella Vista players
Club Nacional de Football players
Liverpool F.C. (Montevideo) players
Club de Gimnasia y Esgrima La Plata footballers
Sud América players
Defensor Sporting players
Club Atlético River Plate (Montevideo) players
Textil Mandiyú footballers
C.S. Cartaginés players
Uruguayan Primera División players
Uruguayan Segunda División players
Primera Nacional players
Liga FPD players
Uruguay international footballers
Uruguayan expatriate footballers
Uruguayan expatriate sportspeople in Argentina
Uruguayan expatriate sportspeople in Costa Rica
Expatriate footballers in Argentina
Expatriate footballers in Costa Rica
Uruguayan football managers
Sud América managers
Club Nacional managers
C.A. Bella Vista managers
Peñarol managers
Liverpool F.C. (Montevideo) managers
Venezia F.C. managers
Oman national football team managers
Centro Atlético Fénix managers
Deportivo Maldonado managers
Lincoln Red Imps F.C. managers
Gibraltar national football team managers
Uruguayan expatriate football managers
Uruguayan expatriate sportspeople in Paraguay
Uruguayan expatriate sportspeople in Oman
Uruguayan expatriate sportspeople in Spain
Uruguayan expatriate sportspeople in Gibraltar
Expatriate football managers in Paraguay
Expatriate football managers in Oman
Expatriate football managers in Gibraltar
Juventud de Las Piedras managers